Van Gils or Van Gilse is a Dutch toponymic surname meaning "from Gilze". People with this name include:

Van Gils
 (born 1986), Dutch snowboarder
Stéphanie Van Gils (born 1991), Belgian football forward
Wanny van Gils (born 1959), Dutch football forward and coach

Van Gilse
Jan van Gilse (1881–1944), Dutch composer and conductor
Nicolaï van Gilse van der Pals (1891–1969), Russian conductor and musicologist
Leopold van Gilse van der Pals (1884–1966), Russian composer

References

Dutch-language surnames
Toponymic surnames